Pierrick Cros (born 17 March 1992) is a French professional footballer who plays as a centre-back for  club Laval. He formerly played for Ligue 1 side Saint-Étienne, and was a France youth international.

Honours 
Laval

 Championnat National: 2021–22

References

External links
 
 
 
 
 

1992 births
Living people
Association football defenders
French footballers
AS Saint-Étienne players
ES Uzès Pont du Gard players
Red Star F.C. players
Platanias F.C. players
Andrézieux-Bouthéon FC players
FC Bastia-Borgo players
Stade Lavallois players
Ligue 1 players
Ligue 2 players
Super League Greece players
Championnat National players
Expatriate footballers in Greece
French expatriate sportspeople in Greece
People from Montbrison, Loire
Sportspeople from Loire (department)
Footballers from Auvergne-Rhône-Alpes